

This is a list of the National Register of Historic Places listings in Bridgeport, Connecticut.

This is intended to be a complete list of the properties and districts on the National Register of Historic Places in the city of Bridgeport, Connecticut, United States. The locations of National Register properties and districts for which the latitude and longitude coordinates are included below, may be seen in an online map.

There are 286 properties and districts listed on the National Register in Fairfield County, including 9 National Historic Landmarks. The city of Bridgeport is the location of 55 of these properties and districts; they are listed here.  Ones in Greenwich or Stamford are covered in National Register of Historic Places listings in Greenwich, Connecticut or in National Register of Historic Places listings in Stamford, Connecticut.  The remainder are covered in National Register of Historic Places listings in Fairfield County, Connecticut.

Current listings

|}

Former listings

|}

See also

History of Bridgeport, Connecticut
National Register of Historic Places listings in Fairfield County, Connecticut
National Register of Historic Places listings in Stamford, Connecticut
National Register of Historic Places listings in Greenwich, Connecticut

References

 Bridgeport